Leslie J. Sacks (1952 – September 26, 2013) was a Los Angeles-based art dealer and founder of Women's Voices Now.

Early life
Sacks was born to a Jewish family in Johannesburg, South Africa in 1952, the second of three children born to Lithuanian Jewish immigrants. His father was South African businessman Wolfe Harry Sacks.  His sister Caron Sacks is married to Israeli politician Ze'ev Bielski, and is the mother of actress Adi Bielski. His brother Rodney Sacks is the co-founder of Monster Beverage.

Sacks graduated from the University of the Witwatersrand with a degree in psychology and computer science. While in college, he fought against apartheid.

Career
In 1981, he opened his first art gallery, Les Art, in South Africa. In 1991, he moved to Los Angeles and opened Leslie Sacks Fine Art in Brentwood, California. In 2007, he purchased the Bobbie Greenfield Gallery at Bergamot Station, renaming it Leslie Sacks Contemporary. His specialities were African tribal art, post-war artists, and contemporary artists including Andy Warhol and Robert Motherwell. His collection of African art was published in Refined Eye, Passionate Heart - African Art from the Leslie Sacks Collection by Skira.

Philanthropy
In 2010, Sacks founded and funded Women's Voices Now, a charity dedicated to "empowering women living in Muslim-majority societies by promoting their free expression, thereby giving voice to the struggles for civil, economic, political, and gender rights". He was an ardent supporter of the state of Israel. Sacks produced a documentary about his father, South Africa businessman Wolfe Harry Sacks.

Personal life
Sacks died of cancer on September 26, 2013. He was survived by his wife Gina Brourman-Sacks, an immigrant from South Korea. He has two sons and two stepsons. His wife succeeded him as board chair of Women's Voices Now.

References

1952 births
2013 deaths
American people of Lithuanian-Jewish descent
South African Jews
South African people of Lithuanian-Jewish descent
American art collectors
Jewish American philanthropists
Leslie
University of the Witwatersrand alumni
American art dealers
People from Johannesburg
21st-century American Jews